Maa Pitambara  Temple  is a Hindu temple of the mahavidya goddess Bagalamukhi. It was established by Param Pujaya Shri Shri Pitambara Pithadhishwar Yogiraj Youdhishthir Ji Maharaj. The temble is located in Amleshwar, a town south of Raipur in Chhattisgarh, India.

Gallery

See also
 List of Hindu temples in India

References

Maa Pitambara Bagalamukhi Temple Amleshwar

Hindu temples in Chhattisgarh
D